Pedro Aleandro (October 11, 1910 – July 1, 1985 in Buenos Aires) was an Argentine actor. He starred in films such as Albéniz (1947), La de los ojos color del tiempo (1952) and El octavo infierno (1964). He was married to María Luisa Robledo. His daughters, María Vaner and Norma Aleandro, were also actresses.

References

External links

Argentine male film actors
Male actors from Buenos Aires
1910 births
1985 deaths